"Without You (Not Another Lonely Night)" is a 1982 song by Franke and the Knockouts. It peaked at number 24 on the U.S. Billboard Hot 100 and number 22 Cash Box during the spring of that year.  It spent 15 weeks on the charts and became their second biggest hit single.

Internationally, "Without You" charted only in Canada, narrowly missing the Top 40.  On WLS-AM in Chicago, the song reached number 18.

Chart history

Weekly charts

References

External links
 Lyrics of this song
 

1982 singles
Franke and the Knockouts songs
Songs written by Franke Previte
Millennium Records singles
1982 songs
Songs about nights
Songs about loneliness